MacWWW, also known as Samba, is an early minimalist web browser from 1992 meant to run on Macintosh computers. It was the first web browser for the classic Mac OS platform, and the first for any non-Unix operating system. MacWWW tries to emulate the design of WorldWideWeb. Unlike modern browsers it opens each link in a new window only after a double-click. It was a commercial product from CERN and cost 50 European Currency Units

The browser is no longer available from its original ftp location, but can still be downloaded from mirrors.

History
It was written at CERN by Robert Cailliau and later Nicola Pellow helped with the development. Pellow worked originally on the Line Mode Browser and both browsers shared some parts of the source code after her switching.
Pre-alpha version were available, but this version worked only on "coliur [sic] mac but not on big black and white ones it seems."

Version 1.00 was released on 12 May 1993 with the commentary: "We know there is much to be improved, but it works well on system 7 and system 6.0.5".

Features

The MacWWW which was a minimalist browser displayed only text, no images nor lists.
Implemented in THINK C using its human interface objects.
Uses much code in common with the Line Mode browser. This code later became libwww.
bookmarks
For the hypertext object, the THINK C text object was modified to allow multifont capability, and to allow anchors to be encoded in the styles.
According to critics, within a year the browser became obsolete because Mosaic and MacWeb had much more features, for example MacWWW showed no loading status. Without the mouse and MacOS support MacWWW would be a text-mode browser.

See also
List of old Macintosh software

Annotations

References

External links
 MacWWW description and screenshot
 evolt.org – This browser archive has version 1.03 for download

Classic Mac OS-only web browsers
1992 software
Discontinued web browsers